Vladimir Yuryevich Yeryomin (born 18 December 1965) is a retired Soviet professional football player.

Honours
 Soviet Top League bronze: 1991.
 USSR Federation Cup winner: 1990.
 1990–91 UEFA Cup with FC Chornomorets Odesa: 2 games.

External links
 

1965 births
Sportspeople from Smolensk
Living people
Soviet footballers
Russian footballers
FC Chornomorets Odesa players
FC Torpedo Moscow players
FC Metalurh Zaporizhzhia players
FC Metallurg Lipetsk players
FC Oryol players
Soviet Top League players
Association football midfielders
FC Iskra Smolensk players